Shake It Up is an Indian Sitcom airing on Disney Channel India. The series premiered on 30 March 2013. It is an Indian adaptation of the 2010–2013 American television series of the same name. The series was created by Chris Thompson.

It revolves around the misadventures of best friends Neel (Neeladri) Walia and Yash (Yashpal) Mehta, two confident and energetic 13-year-olds who are skilled dancers and are on the threshold of taking their steps into the world of professional dancing.

Cast and Characters

Main 
Sparsh Shrivastav as Neeladri "Neel" Walia: He is the equivalent of CeCe Jones, portrayed by Bella Thorne.
Ojas Godtwar as Yashpal "Yash" Mehta: He is the equivalent of Rocky Blue, portrayed by Zendaya.
Asawari Joshi as S.P Kiran Walia: She is the equivalent of Georgia Jones, portrayed by Anita Barone.
Faiq Shaikh as Ayush Walia: He is the equivalent of Flynn Jones, portrayed by Davis Cleveland.
Preet Rajput as Jay Mehta: He is the equivalent of Ty Blue, portrayed by Roshon Fegan.
Alam Khan as Dheeraj Dambole: He is the equivalent of Deuce Martinez, portrayed by Adam Irigoyen.
Raj Saluja as Shekhar Grover: He is the equivalent of Gary Wilde, portrayed by R. Brandon Johnson.

Recurring 
Ayush Narang as Manjot "Jo" Dhillon: He is the equivalent of Gunther Hessenheffer, portrayed by Kenton Duty.
Riddhi Arora as Mandeep "Di" Dhillon: She is the equivalent of Tinka Hessenheffer, portrayed by Caroline Sunshine.
Goolshan Mazdiaani as Batiwala Aunty: She is the equivalent of Mrs. Loccasio, portrayed by Renée Taylor.
Ayesha Kaduskar as Dina Shah: She is the equivalent of Dina Garcia, portrayed by Ainsley Bailey.

Promotion 
A promotional music video with cast of the film ABCD: Any Body Can Dance and Shake It Up aired on the channel in January 2013.

See also 
 Disney Channel India Original Series

References

External links 

Disney Channel (Indian TV channel) original programming
Indian television series based on American television series
Television series by Disney
2013 Indian television series debuts
2013 Indian television series endings
Television series about teenagers
Television series about television
Dyslexia in fiction
Television shows set in Mumbai
Indian teen sitcoms
Shake It Up (American TV series)
Hindi language television sitcoms
Indian dance television shows